Micrathena, known as spiny orbweavers, is a genus of orb-weaver spiders first described by Carl Jakob Sundevall in 1833. Micrathena contains more than a hundred species, most of them Neotropical woodland-dwelling species. The name is derived from the Greek "micro", meaning "small", and the goddess Athena.

Species with extremely long spines evolved at least eight times in the genus Micrathena and likely function as anti-predator defenses. Gasteracantha orb-weavers also have hardened abdomens with variously shaped spines, but they are not closely related to Micrathena within the orb-weaver family.

These spiders are active during the daytime and build vertical orb webs. Unlike many other orb-weavers, members of Micrathena bite their prey before wrapping it. When laying eggs, females will place the egg sac on vegetation near the web.

Species
 the genus Micrathena contains 119 species:

In North America
Although the genus includes over a hundred species, only four are found in the United States and Canada. Among those four species, female spined micrathena (Micrathena gracilis) have five pairs of conical tubercles, female M. mitrata have two short posterior pairs, and female arrow-shaped micrathena (M. sagittata) have three pairs. The only species recorded from Canada is M. sagittata, found in Ontario.

References

Araneidae
Araneidae genera